The  is a professional wrestling championship in Ganbare☆Pro-Wrestling (GanPro), a sub-brand of the Japanese promotion CyberFight. The title is the first to be created specifically for GanPro.

, there have been four reigns shared among four different wrestlers. The current champion is Mizuki Watase who is in his first reign.

History
Ganbare☆Pro-Wrestling was created in 2013 by Ken Ohka as a brand of DDT Pro-Wrestling. The brand was created to capture the spirit of small independent promotions in Japan and, to do so, regularly brought in wrestlers from outside the promotion. On March 18, 2017, Ohka beat Shiori Asahi at a Kaientai Dojo event to win the Independent World Junior Heavyweight Championship. The title stayed with the promotion where it served as its main singles title until January 2021 when it moved to Professional Wrestling Just Tap Out (JTO). Now without a singles title to promote, in September 2021, GanPro revived the Ganbare☆Climax tournament and created the Spirit of Ganbare World Openweight Championship as a prize for the winner of the tournament. On November 23, Tatsuhito Takaiwa went on to defeat Yumehito Imanari in the final and won the inaugural title.

Inaugural tournament

Reigns

See also
Professional wrestling in Japan

References

World professional wrestling championships
Openweight wrestling championships